Dale Myers may refer to:
 Dale K. Myers (born 1955), John F. Kennedy assassination researcher
 Dale D. Myers (1922–2015), Deputy Administrator of NASA